In neuroanatomy, the parieto-occipital sulcus (also called the parieto-occipital fissure) is a deep sulcus in the cerebral cortex that marks the boundary between the cuneus and precuneus, and also between the parietal and occipital lobes. Only a small part can be seen on the lateral surface of the hemisphere, its chief part being on the medial surface.

The lateral part of the parieto-occipital sulcus (Fig. 726) is situated about 5 cm in front of the occipital pole of the hemisphere, and measures about 1.25 cm. in length.

The medial part of the parieto-occipital sulcus (Fig. 727) runs downward and forward as a deep cleft on the medial surface of the hemisphere, and joins the calcarine fissure below and behind the posterior end of the corpus callosum. In most cases, it contains a submerged gyrus.

Function
The parieto-occipital lobe has been found in various neuroimaging studies, including PET (positron-emission-tomography) studies, and SPECT (single-photon emission computed tomography) studies, to be involved along with the dorsolateral prefrontal cortex during planning.

Gallery

References

External links

 
 https://web.archive.org/web/20070316043257/http://www2.umdnj.edu/~neuro/studyaid/Practical2000/Q30.htm

Sulci (neuroanatomy)
Articles containing video clips
Medial surface of cerebral hemisphere